(plural ) is a traditional Welsh and Cornish short poem form. It uses quantitative metres, involving the counting of syllables, and rigid patterns of rhyme and half rhyme.

Early history

It is the only set stanzaic metre found in the early Welsh poetic corpus, and explanations for its origins have tended to focus on stanzaic Latin poetry and hymns; however, it is as likely to be a development within the Brittonic poetic tradition. Whereas the metrical rules of later  are clear (and are based on counting syllables), the precise metre of the early  is debated and could have involved stress-counting. The earliest  are found as marginalia written in a tenth-century hand in the Juvencus Manuscript.

Types of englynion

Details of their structures are as follows; not all of these, however, are included in the Traditional Welsh poetic metres.

Englyn penfyr 

Also known as the short-ended . It consists of a stanza of three lines. The first line has ten syllables (in two groups of five), the second has five to six; and the third has seven. The seventh, eighth or ninth syllable of the first line introduces the rhyme and this is repeated on the last syllable of the other two lines. The fourth syllable of the second line may echo the final syllable of the first through either rhyme or consonance.

Englyn unodl union 
The straight one-rhymed , identical to  except that it addes a fourth, rhyming, seven-syllable line at the end. Thus it consists of four lines of ten, six, seven and seven syllables. The seventh, eighth or ninth syllable of the first line introduces the rhyme and this is repeated on the last syllable of the other three lines. The part of the first line after the rhyme alliterates with the first part of the second line.

Englyn milwr 

The soldier's . This consists of three seven-syllable lines. All three lines rhyme.

Englyn gwastad 
The even , more common in the Middle Ages than later. This consists of four seven-syllable lines. All four lines rhyme. One example (showing the half-rhyme of -edd with -er) is:

Englyn byr crwca 
The short crooked . This is like , but orders the lines differently: seven syllables in the first, ten syllables (in two groups of five) in the second, and five to six syllables in the third. In the following example, the second line does not participate in the rhyme:

Englyn unodl crwca 

The crooked one-rhyme . This  is like , except that it adds an extra seven-syllable line at the beginning. This is made up of four lines of seven, seven, ten and six syllables. The last syllables of the first, second and last lines and the seventh, eighth or ninth syllable of the third line all rhyme.

Englyn cyrch 

The seeking . This form has four lines of seven syllables each. The final syllables of the first, second, and last line rhyme. The final syllable of the third line rhymes with the second, third or fourth syllable of the last line:

Englyn proest dalgron} 

In this , there are four seven-syllable lines that half-rhyme with each other (half-rhyme means that the final consonants agree).

Englyn lleddfbroest 

Englyn proest cadwynog 

The chain half-rhyme . In this version there are four lines of seven syllables. The first and third lines rhyme and the second and fourth half rhyme on the same vowel sound as the full rhyme syllables.

Englyn proest cyfnewidiog

The reciprocal half-rhyme . This has four lines of seven syllables. All four lines half-rhyme, and there is additional cynghanedd.

Englyn toddaid

Englyn cil-dwrn
After the first two lines there is just one more line of three syllables or fewer, which follows the rhyme of the first two lines.

Other forms 

The novelist Robertson Davies once said that  were an old enthusiasm of his. He said that the form was derived by the Welsh from the inscriptions on Roman tombs in Wales. According to him,  must have four lines, the first one having ten syllables, then six, then the last two having seven syllables each. In the first line there must be a break after the seventh, eighth, or ninth syllable, and the rhyme with the second line comes at this break; but the tenth syllable of the first line must either rhyme or be in assonance with the middle of the second line. The last two lines must rhyme with the first rhyme in the first line, but the third or fourth line must rhyme on a weak syllable.

Examples 

Here are two  by the twelfth-century Welsh poet Cynddelw Brydydd Mawr:

The poet Robert Graves wrote an englyn in English, included in the Juvinalia (1910 - 1914) of his Complete Poems

Here is an English-language  by novelist Robertson Davies.

Breton
Breton poet Padrig an habask also writes Breton englynion: in 2020 he has published a collection of them called Lampreiz. (http://brezhoneg.org/en/node/11057)

See also 

 Englynion y Beddau
 Englynion y Clywaid
 Cerdd dafod

References

Cornish literature
Stanzaic form
Welsh poetry